Rudrama Devi, also Maharani Rudramma Devi, was a queen of the  Kakatiya dynasty in the Deccan Plateau from 1263 to 1289 (or 1295) until her death. She was among the women to rule as monarchs in India and promoted a male image in order to do so. This was a significant change and one that was followed by her successor and also by the later Vijayanagara Empire.

Reign & Family  

Rudrama Devi married Vengi Chalukya prince Virabhadra around the year 1240. This was almost certainly a political marriage designed by her father to forge alliances. Virabhadra is virtually undocumented and played no part in her administration. The couple had two daughters (both are adopted). Rudrama Devi probably began her rule of the Kakatiya kingdom jointly with her father, Ganapatideva, as his co-regent, from 1261 to 1262. She assumed full sovereignty in 1263. Unlike her Kakatiya predecessors, she chose to recruit as warriors many people who were not aristocratic, granting them rights over land tax revenue in return for their support.

Marco Polo, who visited India probably some time around 1289–1293, made note of Rudrama Devi's rule and nature in flattering terms. She continued the planned fortification of the capital, raising the height of Ganapati's wall as well as adding a second earthen curtain wall  in diameter and with an additional -wide moat.

Rudrama Devi faced challenges from the Eastern Ganga dynasty and the Yadavas soon after beginning her rule. She was able to repel the former, who retreated beyond the Godavari River in the late 1270s, and she also defeated the Yadavas, who were forced to cede territory in western Andhra. She was, however, unsuccessful in dealing with the internal dissent posed by the Kayastha chieftain Ambadeva after he became head of his line in 1273. Ambadeva objected to being subordinate to the Kakatiyas and he gained control of much of northeastern Andhra and what is now Guntur District.

Rudrama Devi may have died in 1289 while fighting Ambadeva, although some sources say she did not die until 1295. She was succeeded by Prataparudra, the son of her elder daughter Mummadamma, who inherited a kingdom that was smaller than it had been when Rudrama Devi had ascended her throne.

In popular culture 
In 2015, filmmaker Gunasekhar made a Telugu film Rudhramadevi on the life of Rudrama Devi with Anushka Shetty playing the titular role.

Peninsula Pictures produced a serial on Star Maa titled Rudramadevi which pictured the childhood of Rudramadevi to the TV viewers for 100 episodes.

See also 
 History of women in early modern warfare

Notes

References

External links 

 

Indian queens
Women in 13th-century warfare
Kakatiya dynasty
Indian women in war
13th-century women rulers
13th-century Indian monarchs
Indian female royalty
1289 deaths
Date of birth unknown
1295 deaths
13th-century Indian women
People from Nellore district